The Dr. J. R. Masterson House, at Ohio Ave. and 2nd St. in Tonopah, Nevada, is a  stone and frame historic building that was built in 1908.  It has also been known as the Fred Chapman House.  It was built as a residence and later served as a rooming house for most of its existence.  It was a work of James Golden.  It was listed on the National Register of Historic Places in 1982.

At the time of its NRHP listing, it was the largest stone residence in Tonopah and was deemed significant also for its association with physician J.R. Masterson 1914–c.1920, with mining engineer Fred Chapman during 1923–1945, and with Judge William Hatton who boarded there.

References 

Houses completed in 1908
Hotels in Nevada
Houses on the National Register of Historic Places in Nevada
National Register of Historic Places in Tonopah, Nevada
Houses in Nye County, Nevada
1908 establishments in Nevada